AVIUS was a UK-based, three piece alt/rock band.

Personnel 
The members of Avius were Sebastian Brice (guitar and vocals), Adam DT (bass guitar and vocals) and Bertie Whitfield (drums).  They met while studying at Bath Spa University

Sebastian Brice is also a successful model and is the son of Trevor Brice, who was part of the 1960s band Vanity Fare.

Career 
In 2010 Avius was chosen to be one of the bands promoted by fashion brand Burberry in 'Burberry Acoustic' which saw Sebastian Brice and Avius featured in the London Evening Standard. and The Black Book.

In September 2011, Avius provided the live music accompaniment for Ennio Capasa's C'N'C Costume National show in Milan.  The performance was broadcast live on the internet, via Camera Nazionale della Moda Italiana (National Chamber of Italian Fashion).

Avius made the finals (out of 7,000 performers) in the 2011 Pizza Express "Big Audition with Jamie Cullum" competition.

Recordings 

The EP "Avius" was recorded live at Studio Paranormal in 2011, and released by BA1 records, the in house label at the City of Bath College.  It included the following songs (Lyrics: Sebastian Brice / Music: Avius):
 Holding On
 Said and Done
 66 & 99
 Without Sin

References

External links 
 Avius on Spotify
 EP "Avius" issued in 2011
 Avius YouTube channel
 Burberry Acoustic
 Pizza Express competition

English alternative rock groups
Musicians from Bath, Somerset
Musical groups from Somerset